Rock Climbers is FLOW's twenty third single. Its A-Side was used as ending theme song for the TV shows Nounai Word Q Hikidas! and Roke Mitsu ~Roke x Roke x Roke~. The single has two editions: regular and limited. It reached #43 on the Oricon charts and charted for 2 weeks. *

Track listing

References

2012 songs
Ki/oon Music singles
Flow (band) songs